The Battle of Khalil took place on 22–23 February 2013 and was part of the Northern Mali conflict, the battle began on the 22nd with two suicide bombings.

According to the MNLA, the first suicide bomber attempted to drive his car into a building, but the car was destroyed by fighters ahead of impact. A second car then drove into the group's local operations center and exploded, instantly killing four including three MNLA fighters and the bomber. The MUJAO immediately claimed responsibility for both bombings and said it specifically targeted the MNLA for their part in siding with the French intervention.

On 23 February, the MAA claimed to have attacked In-Khalil and taken full control over the area. The MNLA then renewed a counter-attack on Khalil. Over the course of the fighting French fighter jets regularly supported MNLA units. The battle resulted in the French-MNLA forces re-taking the town of In Khalil from the Islamist groups Ansar Dine and AQIM.

Background
According to MNLA, his army was facing a coalition of MUJAO, Anshar al-Sharia and the Arab Movement of Azawad. Oumar Ould Hamaha, and Hussein Ghoulam were commanding the MUJAO-Anshar al-Sharia forces, while MAA claimed that one of its representatives, Boubacar Ould Taleb, present in Khalil, was commanding MAA forces.

The MAA claimed to have attacked the town of In Khalil in retaliation for abuses committed by the MNLA against Arab civilians. He accused Tuareg fighters of seizing all the vehicles belonging to Arabs, of emptying businesses and raping women. The MAA claimed to have tried to negotiate with the MNLA but without success, while saying that is ready to join forces with French forces. In turn, MLNA denied the allegations, and blamed MAA for joining forces with MUJAO.

According to the Malian press, the abuses mentioned by the MAA took place in In Khalil, during a demonstration of the MNLA seeking autonomy. Arab traders who refused to join the march were then attacked by the rebels, who looted their stores. Then, MNLA fighters reportedly went to a camp where three women were allegedly gang-raped. The situation become tense with MLNA, when the general secretary of the movement, Bilal Ag Acherif, ordered the looters to return the stolen goods.

The battle
On 23 February around thirty armored vehicles attacked from the north-east and north-west sides of the city, according to the MNLA. In the afternoon, the MAA claimed to have taken control of the village, but the MNLA claimed that Tuaregs defeated the Jihadists and that they were victorious. At the end of the day both sides claimed victory and claimed to control In Khalil. An unidentified convoy of vehicles then retreated to Algeria.

Finally, on 4 March the MAA admitted to have lost the battle, after the French Air Force had bombed some of their vehicles, killing 5 of its fighters. A day later, French airplanes bombarded the main base of MAA, 8 km from In Khalil, wounding many fighters.

See also

 Arab Islamic Front of Azawad
 Ansar Dine
 Arab Movement of Azawad
 Azawadi declaration of independence
 Jama'at Nasr al-Islam wal Muslimin
 Niger Movement for Justice
 Northern Mali conflict
 Popular Movement for the Liberation of Azawad
 Tuareg rebellion (1962–1964)
 Tuareg rebellion (1990–1995)
 Tuareg rebellion (2007–2009)
 Tuareg rebellion (2012)

References

2013 in Mali
Khalil
Khalil
History of Azawad
February 2013 events in Africa
Battles in 2013